Ralph Landrum (born August 16, 1957) is an American professional golfer.

Landrum was born in Covington, Kentucky. He played college golf at the University of Kentucky. He turned professional in 1979.  His sons, Kyle and Joe, played college golf at Murray State in Kentucky.

Landrum played on the PGA Tour from 1983 to 1985. His best finish was a T-2 at the 1984 Danny Thomas Memphis Classic. His best finish in a major was a T-8 at the 1983 U.S. Open. Since his touring career, Landrum founded Landrum Golf Management and continues to work as a PGA Master professional. As of 2019, Golf Digest lists Landrum as a top golf instructor in the state of Kentucky.

Professional wins
1986 Kentucky PGA Championship
1987 Kentucky Open, Kentucky PGA Championship, Kentucky PGA Match Play Championship
1988 Kentucky PGA Match Play Championship

Results in major championships

Note: Landrum never played in The Open Championship.

CUT = missed the half-way cut
"T" = tied

References

External links

Profile at PGA of America

American male golfers
Kentucky Wildcats men's golfers
PGA Tour golfers
Golfers from Kentucky
Sportspeople from Covington, Kentucky
1957 births
Living people